Hurricane Mesa is a Utah landform near Hurricane, Utah, used for Cold War tests of rocket ejection seats for supersonic aircraft at the Hurricane Supersonic Research Site.

Currently the facility is still used to test military ejection seats for the US and Foreign Govt's.

References

Landforms of Washington County, Utah
Mesas of Utah